Flatwoods is an unincorporated community in Ripley County, in the U.S. state of Missouri.

History
A post office called Flatwoods was established in 1900, and remained in operation until 1954. The community was descriptively named for flatwoods near the original town site.

References

Unincorporated communities in Ripley County, Missouri
Unincorporated communities in Missouri